The Kaipara tidal power station is a proposed tidal power project to be located in the Kaipara Harbour.  The project is being developed by Crest Energy, with an ultimate size of 200MW at a cost of $600 million.

Crest plans to place the turbines at least 30 metres deep along a ten kilometre stretch of the main channel. Historical charts show this stretch of the channel has changed little over 150 years. The output of the turbines will cycle twice daily with the predictable rise and fall of the tide. Each turbine will have a maximum output of 1.2 MW, and is expected to generate 0.75 MW averaged over time.

In 2013, it was announced that the project had been put on hold, and most of the shares in Crest Energy had been sold to Todd Energy.

Kaipara Harbour
The entrance to Kaipara Harbour, one of the largest harbours in the world, is a channel to the Tasman Sea. On average, Kaipara tides rise and fall . At high tide, nearly 1000 square kilometres are flooded. Spring tidal flows reach 9 km/h (5 knots) in the entrance channel and move 1,990 million cubic meters per tidal movement or 7,960 million cubic meters daily.

Consents
In 2008, the Northland Regional Council granted resource consents for only 100 turbines.  This was appealed to the Environment Court, which in 2011 set conditions for the project allowing for 200 turbines, with many conditions including staged development.  The minister of conservation granted resource consents for the project in March 2011. The consents lapsed 10 years after they were granted, in early 2021.

See also
 Ocean power in New Zealand
 Aotearoa Wave and Tidal Energy Association
 List of power stations in New Zealand

References

External links
 Crest Energy

Proposed tidal power stations
Proposed renewable energy power stations in New Zealand
Todd Corporation
Kaipara Harbour